Marcos René Fuentes Montoya (born June 5, 1973, in Naucalpan, State of Mexico) is a Mexican football manager and former player.

External links
 

1973 births
Living people
Club Necaxa footballers
Liga MX players
Mexican football managers
Footballers from the State of Mexico
People from Naucalpan
Association footballers not categorized by position
Mexican footballers